Maera can refer to:

Mythology and religion
The name Maera or Maira is used by several beings in Greek mythology:
Maera (hound), hound of Icarius, was turned into the dog star
Maera, daughter of Proetus the son of Thersander, mother of Locrus by Zeus
Maera, daughter of Atlas, wife of Tegeates
Maera, one of the Nereids, daughters of Nereus and Doris
Maera, one of the four daughters of the river god Erasinus, along with Anchirhoe, Byze and Melite; they are associated with Britomartis
Maera or Mæra, an alternative name for Mara, a demon in Buddhist teachings

Biology
Maera (crustacean), a genus of amphipod crustaceans

Places
Maera (Arcadia), a town of ancient Arcadia, Greece
Mæra, a land in the Norse saga of Egill Skallagrímsson

See also
Marea (disambiguation) 
Mera (disambiguation)